The Émosson Dam is a hydroelectric dam development located in Switzerland in the canton of Valais.

History
A company (Électricité d'Émosson SA) was created in 1954 to build the dam. The Franco-Swiss development, because of the source of capital, uses different pumping water sites and power generation plants. The construction was decided in April 1967. Previously, a border change was made so that the work was entirely on Swiss territory. Indeed, the border would have cut the dam into two. The communes concerned therefore conducted an exchange of territories, endorsed in 1963. Work began in 1967, and commissioning took place in 1975, eight years later.

Origin of the waters
Three collectors transport the water to the Émosson Dam.

A free flow gallery of  length leads the water by gravity to a shielded well where the water crosses the Trient Valley and then rises, always by gravity to the dam.

The West Collector picks up the waters of the French vallies of Bérard and Tré-les-eaux. These waters are channelled by free-flow in a gallery of  directly to the dam.

Location

The dam is located in the Canton of Valais, on the left bank of the Rhône above Martigny. It is fed by the waters of the Mont Blanc massif. The Émosson Dam is Switzerland's third highest dam after the Grande Dixence and Mauvoisin Dams.

References

External links

Hydroelectric power stations in Switzerland
Dams in Switzerland
Dams completed in 1972
Arch dams
Valais
20th-century architecture in Switzerland